The Sri Lanka women's cricket team toured the West Indies in March 2003. They played the West Indies in six One Day Internationals, winning all six matches to take the series 6–0.

Squads

Tour Matches

50-over match: Saint Vincent and the Grenadines v Sri Lanka

50-over match: Trinidad and Tobago v Sri Lanka

WODI Series

1st ODI

2nd ODI

3rd ODI

4th ODI

5th ODI

6th ODI

References

External links
Sri Lanka Women tour of West Indies 2002/03 from Cricinfo

Women's international cricket tours of the West Indies
Sri Lanka women's national cricket team tours
2003 in women's cricket